Watts is a surname, and may refer to:

Arts and entertainment 
 Alaric Alexander Watts, British poet and journalist
 Caroline Watts, British artist
 Danièle Watts, American actress
 David G. Watts, British game designer
 George Frederic Watts, British painter and sculptor
 Heather Watts, American ballerina and dancer
 Jon Watts, American filmmaker
 Julia Watts, American author
 Julie Watts, Australian author and publisher
 Julie Watts, Australian poet, winner of the Blake Poetry Prize in 2017
 Mary Stanbery Watts (born 1868), American novelist
 Naomi Watts, British actress
 Peter Watts (author), Canadian author and biologist
 Richard Watts, Jr., American theater critic
 Robert Watts, British film producer
 Robert Watts (artist), American artist
 Rolonda Watts, American actress and talk show host
 Stanley J. Watts, American artist
 Theodore Watts-Dunton, British poet and critic
 Tim Watts (filmmaker), British filmmaker
 Walter Henry Watts (17761842), British artist and journalist

Music 

 André Watts, German-American pianist
 Charlie Watts (1941–2021), British drummer of The Rolling Stones
 Clem Watts, pseudonym of Al Trace, a prolific American songwriter and orchestra leader
 Elizabeth Watts, British soprano
 Ernie Watts, American jazz musician
 Helen Watts, Welsh singer
 Isaac Watts (16741748), English hymn-writer, theologian, and logician
 Ivo Watts-Russell, indie music entrepreneur
 Jeff "Tain" Watts, American jazz drummer
 John Watts (composer)
 Lou Watts, British musician in the band Chumbawamba
 Lyndon Watts, Australian bassoonist
 Nathan Watts, American bass guitar player
 Pete Overend Watts (1947–2017), English rock bassist, founding member of Mott the Hoople
 Raymond Watts, American musician and member of the band PIG
 Reggie Watts, American comedian and musician

Crime 

 Christopher Lee Watts (born 1985), perpetrator of the Watts family murders (2018)
 Coral Eugene Watts (19532007), American murderer
 Joe Watts, American mobster

Law 

 Richard C. Watts (1853–1930), an Associate Justice of the South Carolina Supreme Court
 Shirley M. Watts (born 1959), a Judge of the Maryland Court of Appeals

Military and naval
 John Watts (sailor) (c. 1778–1823), U.S. merchant captain from Virginia
 John Cliffe Watts (1786–1873), British military officer and colonial architect in New South Wales
 John Watts de Peyster  (1821–1907), author on the art of war, philanthropist, and early Adjutant General of the New York National Guard
 John Watts de Peyster Jr. (1841–1873), Union Army officer during the American Civil War
 Philip Watts (naval architect), British naval architect

Politics
 Alfred Watts (South Australian politician) (1815–1884), South Australian businessman and politician
 Alfred Watts (Western Australian politician) (1873–1954), Australian politician
 Arthur Watts (politician) (1897–1970), Australian politician
 David Watts (politician), British politician
 J.C. Watts, American politician
 John Watts, postmaster of Oregon and disputed elector in the 1876 United States presidential election
 John Watts (Cherokee chief)
 John Watts (New York politician) (1749–1836), U.S. Representative from New York
 John Arthur Watts (1947–2016), British MP for Slough
 John C. Watts (1902–1971), U.S. Representative from Kentucky
 John Sebrie Watts (1816–1876), U.S. House Delegate from New Mexico Territory
 Lala Fay Watts (1881–1971), American suffragette, temperance advocate, and labor activist
 Thomas H. Watts, American politician, 18th Governor of the U.S. state of Alabama

Science, medicine, and academia

 Becky Watts, British college student who was murdered by her family
 David P. Watts, American anthropologist
 Duncan J. Watts, American sociologist
 Frederick Watts, the "Father of Penn State"
 Henry Watts (disambiguation), multiple people
 James W. Watts, American neurosurgeon and early pioneer of lobotomy
 Michael Watts, American geographer
 Ronald Lampman Watts, Canadian academic
 Susan Watts, British science journalist
 Victor Watts (1938–2002), British toponymist, medievalist, translator, and academic

Sports
 Armani Watts, American football player
 Armon Watts (born 1996), American football player
 Bill Watts, American professional wrestler
 Bobby 'Boogaloo' Watts, American boxer
 Brandon Watts, American football player
 Darius Watts, American football player
 Erik Watts, American professional wrestler
 Fergus Watts, Australian footballer
 Fraser Watts, Scottish cricketer
 John Watts, Australian sportsman and broadcaster
 Johnny Watts (English footballer), English football player for Birmingham City F.C.
 Quincy Watts, American athlete
 R. N. Watts, American college sports coach
 Rocket Watts (born 2000), American basketball player
 Slick Watts, American streetball player
 Stan Watts, American basketball coach
 Vanessa Watts, West Indian cricketer
 Wallace Watts, Wales rugby union international
 Wally Watts, Australian footballer

Other 

 Alan Watts, English philosopher
 Anthony Watts (blogger), American blogger and former television weatherman
 C. C. Watts (pastor) Charles Cameron Watts (1895–1965), Australian Congregationalist pastor
 Daniel Watts (disambiguation)
 Franklin Watts, an imprint of U.S. publisher Grolier
 Graham Clive Watts, British construction administrator
 Hugh Watts (bell-founder) (1582/3 – 1643), English bell-founder
 John Watts of the Leake and Watt's Children's Home
 Philip Watts, British businessman
 Richard Watts, British businessman and philanthropist 
 William Watts (East India Company official) of the British East India Company
 Watts family murders

See also 
 Watts (disambiguation)
 Watt (surname)

English-language surnames
Patronymic surnames
Surnames from given names